Kentucky Mutt Creek is a stream in Victoria County, Texas, in the United States.

The origin of the name Kentucky Mutt is obscure. One story tells of a woman who named it after her native home in Kentucky.

See also
List of rivers of Texas

References

Rivers of Victoria County, Texas
Rivers of Texas